The following is a list of ice hockey arenas by capacity. Only those arenas that regularly host ice hockey games with paid admission (e.g. professional, major junior, or university) are included. Outdoor stadiums that have hosted occasional hockey games are not included. Buildings under construction are not included. Buildings which no longer host hockey matches are listed but not ranked, and the capacity for defunct buildings is the capacity at the time of closing, or last use for hockey, unless otherwise mentioned. Buildings are ranked by their current maximum capacity for hockey games, not for other events—which is often substantially different because of ice hockey's unique playing surface, the ice rink. Capacities do not include standing room tickets. All arenas with a capacity of more than 15,000 or smaller are included.

The majority of these arenas are in Canada and the United States, with a small number in Europe; none are on any other continent. Most of the largest arenas are home to professional teams, mainly from the National Hockey League (NHL). All 32 current NHL arenas are listed. None of the teams in the top leagues in Finland (Liiga) or Sweden (SHL), and only one team each in the top league of Czech Republic (Czech Extraliga),  and Germany (Deutsche Eishockey Liga), Switzerland (National League A) or the international Kontinental Hockey League (KHL) (Belarus, China, Finland, Kazakhstan, Latvia, Russia, and Slovakia), play in an arena with a capacity of 15,000 or larger.

Arenas by capacity

Defunct arenas by seating
In this table, "defunct" refers to its status as an ice hockey venue. Many of the venues listed here remain in use for other sports.

See also
Ice hockey arena
List of basketball arenas by capacity
List of European ice hockey arenas
List of indoor arenas in Canada
List of National Hockey League arenas

References

Ice hockey arenas by capacity

Arenas by capacity